Nikolai Stepulov (20 March 1913 – 2 January 1968) was an Estonian lightweight boxer, military officer and criminal. As a boxer he won silver medals at the 1936 Olympic Games in Berlin and 1937 European Championships, and fought professionally in 1938–39. During World War II, after the Soviet invasion of Estonia in 1940, Stepulov, an ethnic Russian, joined the Soviet militia and initiated the extrajudicial killing of a number of imprisoned members of the Estonian Defense League; this act was condemned by both sides and resulted in Stepulov serving a jail sentence in the Soviet Union. Later after returning to Soviet-controlled Estonia he was arrested a few times for burglary and died in a Soviet prison hospital.

Boxing career
Stepulov took up boxing in 1927 and in 1933–37 won six consecutive Estonian titles. At the 1936 Olympics he won his first four bouts and dominated the first round of the final against Imre Harangi of Hungary. Yet Harangi performed better in the last two rounds, despite having both eyebrows swollen and cut open, and won by a close decision. Next year Stepulov narrowly lost the European final against Herbert Nürnberg. In 1938 he turned professional and fought in Finland, Sweden, Denmark and Germany with a record of 5 wins (4 by knockout), 5 losses and 1 draw. His career was cut short by World War II. He attempted to return to boxing in 1945, but retired after placing second at the Estonian championships.

World War II and after
During his boxing career Stepulov served in the Estonian Army as a private, and was promoted to corporal for his Olympic success. In 1937 he worked as a messenger at the Ministry of Economic Affairs. In 1940, when Soviet troops entered Estonia, he enlisted to the Soviet militia and was appointed as a group leader responsible for collecting weapons from the Estonian Defence League (EDL). On 21 June 1940, when an EDL group came to give up their weapons, he ordered to fire at them, killing 17 and wounding more than 12 people. The order was condemned both by Estonians and the Soviet authorities. Stepulov was arrested and spent most of the war in a Soviet prison. After that he returned to Estonia and took odd jobs as a factory worker, turf cutter, lumberjack and boxing coach and referee. He eventually became a heavy drinker and got involved with criminals. In 1955, he was arrested for burglary and sentenced to seven years. He was released after four years, but was later arrested a few more times for similar offenses. In the 1960s he developed the Parkinson’s disease and died in the hospital of the Tallinn central prison.

References

External links

 
 
 
 

1913 births
1968 deaths
Sportspeople from Narva
People from Saint Petersburg Governorate
Estonian male boxers
Lightweight boxers
Olympic boxers of Estonia
Boxers at the 1936 Summer Olympics
Olympic silver medalists for Estonia
Olympic medalists in boxing
Medalists at the 1936 Summer Olympics
Estonian people of Russian descent
Estonian communists
Estonian people of World War II
Soviet military personnel of World War II
Burials at Metsakalmistu